Nuclear prelamin A recognition factor, also known as NARF, is a protein which in humans is encoded by the NARF gene.

Function 

Several proteins have been found to be prenylated and methylated at their carboxyl-terminal ends. Prenylation was initially believed to be important only for membrane attachment. However, another role for prenylation appears to be its importance in protein–protein interactions. The only nuclear proteins known to be prenylated in mammalian cells are prelamin A- and B-type lamins. Prelamin A is farnesylated and carboxymethylated on the cysteine residue of a carboxyl-terminal CaaX motif. This post-translationally modified cysteine residue is removed from prelamin A when it is endoproteolytically processed into mature lamin A. The protein encoded by this gene binds to the prenylated prelamin A carboxyl-terminal tail domain. It may be a component of a prelamin A endoprotease complex. The encoded protein is located in the nucleus, where it partially colocalizes with the nuclear lamina. It shares limited sequence similarity with iron-only bacterial hydrogenases. Alternatively spliced transcript variants encoding different isoforms have been identified for this gene, including one with a novel exon that is generated by RNA editing.

Interactions 

NARF has been shown to interact with LMNA.

References

Further reading 

 
 
 
 
 
 
 

Human proteins